Greece (GRE) has competed at every celebration of the European Athletics Championships since the 1934 European Athletics Championships in Turin, Italy.  

At the 1938 European Championships in Paris, France the Greek team participated with 5 male athletes, without winning any medals.

See also 
 Greece at the IAAF World Championships in Athletics
Greece at the IAAF World Indoor Championships in Athletics
 Greece at the European Athletics Indoor Championships
 Greece at the European Athletics Championships

References 

 
Nations at the 1938 European Athletics Championships
Athletics in Greece